Marquette-lez-Lille (literally Marquette near Lille; Dutch: Market(t)e) is a commune in the Nord department in northern France. It is part of the Métropole Européenne de Lille.

Population

Monuments 
 Grands Moulins de Paris

Heraldry

Twin towns
Marquette-lez-Lille is twinned with:
  Fredersdorf-Vogelsdorf, Germany
  Sleaford, Lincolnshire, England (since 1999)

See also
Communes of the Nord department

References

Marquettelezlille
French Flanders